The Shadow Chancellor of the Duchy of Lancaster is a position in the British Shadow Cabinet, appointed by the Leader of the Opposition. The post involves holding the Chancellor of the Duchy of Lancaster to account, who has control over the estates and rents of the Duchy of Lancaster. The position was re-established by Keir Starmer in April 2020, replacing the position of Shadow Lord President of the Council last held by Jon Trickett, which was split from Shadow Leader of the House of Commons by former Labour leader Jeremy Corbyn.

The position is currently held by Angela Rayner, Labour MP for Ashton-under-Lyne. She was appointed to the role in May 2021 by Keir Starmer, succeeding Rachel Reeves. Rayner shadows Conservative MP Oliver Dowden.

List of Shadow Chancellors of the Duchy of Lancaster

See also
 Official Opposition frontbench
 Shadow Cabinet of Keir Starmer
 Shadow First Secretary of State
 Shadow Chancellor of the Duchy of Lancaster
 Shadow Minister for the Cabinet Office

References

Official Opposition (United Kingdom)